Qobad Beygi (romanized as Qobād Beygī; also known as Ghobad Bagiyan, Khubatbak, Qobād Begīān, Qobād Beygān, Qobād Beygīān, and Qobād Beykīān) is a village in Mangur-e Gharbi Rural District, in the Central District of Piranshahr County, West Azerbaijan Province, Iran. As of the 2006 census, its population was 226, in 36 families.

References 

Populated places in Piranshahr County